Alan Hill (1 July 1933 – July 2010) was a footballer who played as a winger in the Football League for Tranmere Rovers.

References

Tranmere Rovers F.C. players
Association football wingers
English Football League players
1933 births
2010 deaths
English footballers